Chionodes pleroma is a moth in the family Gelechiidae. It is found in Mexico (Guerrero, Oaxaca).

The wingspan is about 16 mm. The forewings are purplish fuscous, with very faintly indicated pale brownish cinereous mottling, a small costal spot of the same at three-fourths from the base somewhat more distinct. The hindwings are bronzy brownish.

References

Chionodes
Moths described in 1911
Moths of Central America